Henri Anthony Melchior Tieleman "Hans" Kolfschoten (17 August 1903 – 2 August 1984) was a Dutch politician of the defunct Catholic People's Party (KVP) now merged into the Christian Democratic Appeal (CDA).

Kolfschoten was minister of Justice, a member of the Senate, and mayor of Eindhoven and The Hague. In 1945, Kolfschoten refused permanent residency to the Polish Jew Chaim Engel and his Dutch wife Selma Engel-Wijnberg, who survived Sobibor extermination camp.

Decorations

References

External links

Official
  Mr. H.A.M.T. (Hans) Kolfschoten Parlement & Politiek
  Mr. H.A.M.T. Kolfschoten (KVP) Eerste Kamer der Staten-Generaal

 

 

1903 births
1984 deaths
Catholic People's Party politicians
Dutch corporate directors
Dutch jurists
Dutch nonprofit directors
Dutch nonprofit executives
Dutch people of World War II
Dutch Roman Catholics
Grand Officers of the Order of Orange-Nassau
Knights of the Order of the Netherlands Lion
Mayors of Eindhoven
Mayors of The Hague
Members of the Senate (Netherlands)
Ministers of Justice of the Netherlands
People from Arnhem
Roman Catholic State Party politicians
University of Amsterdam alumni
20th-century Dutch civil servants
20th-century Dutch politicians